The elongate-gland springsnail, scientific name Pyrgulopsis isolata, is a species of minute freshwater snails with an operculum, aquatic gastropod molluscs or micromolluscs in the family Hydrobiidae. This species is endemic to the United States.

References

Molluscs of the United States
Pyrgulopsis
Gastropods described in 1987
Taxonomy articles created by Polbot